The Munsters Today is an American sitcom and a revival of the original 1964–66 sitcom The Munsters that aired in syndication from October 8, 1988, to May 25, 1991.

Plot
The series concerns the day-to-day life of a family of benign monsters, with married couple Herman Munster and vampire Lily Munster. Lily's Father Grandpa, who is also a vampire, lives with the family. Herman and Lily have a son named Eddie, who is a werewolf, and their niece, Marilyn, whom the family deems as strange, but is the only “normal” member of the family, also lives with them.

This sequel series starts with Grandpa creates "Sleeping Chambers," coffins which make the user fall asleep for a selected amount of time, and insists the entire family try them out. After Grandpa sets the dial for 30 minutes and shuts the door, a flash of light and a falling beam change the dial to "Forever." 22 years later, a man named Mr. Prescott and his assistant explore the Munsters' house with plans to turn it into a parking lot when they unknowingly awaken the Munsters from their Sleeping Chambers. Finding themselves in the 1980s, the Munsters work to adjust themselves to the current time period.

Cast

Main cast

 John Schuck as Herman Munster
 Lee Meriwether as Lily Munster
 Jason Marsden as Edward "Eddie" Wolfgang Munster
 Hilary Van Dyke as Marilyn Munster
 Howard Morton as "Grandpa" Vladimir Dracula

Recurring cast
 Mary Cadorette as Dee Dee Nelson
 Richard Steven Horvitz as Howie Buchanan
 Greg Mullavey as Roger Nelson
 Scott Reeves as Dustin Nelson
 Tiffany Brissette as Shannon Margaret Millhouse 
 Bijou Phillips as August Chutney Millhouse

Special guest stars

 Kaye Ballard as Mother Earth
 Billy Barty as Genie
 Shelley Berman as Sam Hawkins
 Jonathan Brandis as Matt Glover
 Dr. Joyce Brothers as Mrs. Cousins
 Ruth Buzzi as Dracula's Mother
 Gordon Cooper as Himself
 Bill Daily as Count Strimpkin
 Dustin Diamond as Rob
 Moosie Drier as Andy Graves
 Nancy Dussault as Dr. Sandra Brown
 Nanette Fabray as Dottie
 Norman Fell as Mr. Maurice
 Christopher Fielder as Damien
 Lucy Lee Flippin as Natasha Jones
 Kathleen Freeman as Grandma
 George Furth as Dr. Carver
 Zsa Zsa Gabor as Herself
 Kip King as Burt Fearman
 Dave Madden as Mr. Preston
 Eddie Mekka as Mr. Sweetzer
 Richard Moll as Genghis Khan
 Pat Morita as Mr. Watanabe
 Don Most as Barney Morley
 Lois Nettleton as Jessica Brown
 Daniel Riordan as Headlock Henderson
 Marcia Wallace as Dr. Susan Evans
 Jo De Winter as Katja Dracula
 Yetta as Shirley

Production

Development
This color revival of The Munsters starred John Schuck (Herman), Lee Meriwether (Lily), Howard Morton (Grandpa), Hilary Van Dyke (Marilyn) and Jason Marsden (Eddie), and broadcast 73 episodes from October 8, 1988, to May 25, 1991, giving it more first-run episodes than the original series. The pilot explained the 22-year gap following the original series by showing the family as they were in 1966. They were testing out a machine that Grandpa had created. The machine allows someone to sleep for ages without aging. But then an accident took place; the family then proceeds to sleep for years, only to wake up in 1988.

It was created following a failed attempt to revive the show with most of the original cast (Fred Gwynne, Al Lewis and Yvonne De Carlo) in the 1981 NBC telefilm The Munsters' Revenge.

Episodes

Pilot

Season 1 (1988–89)

Season 2 (1989–90)

Season 3 (1990–91)

Reception
The series lasted three seasons in syndication, and proved popular with international audiences.

In the United States, reruns aired on digital subchannel Retro Television Network from August 2008 until their distribution agreement with NBCUniversal expired in June 2011.

Awards and nominations

Stations

See also
The New Addams Family 
Vampire film
List of vampire television series

References

External links

The Munsters Today Information Archives

1988 American television series debuts
1991 American television series endings
1980s American sitcoms
1990s American sitcoms
American fantasy television series
American sequel television series
English-language television shows
Fantasy comedy television series
First-run syndicated television programs in the United States
Television series about families
Television series by Universal Television
The Munsters